João Victor Vieira Ferreira Sousa (born 27 April 2004), known as João Victor, is a Brazilian footballer who plays as a forward for FC Osaka, on loan from Ceará SC.

Club career
Born in São Luís, Maranhão, João Victor finished his formation with Ceará. He made his first team debut at the age of 16 on 10 April 2021, coming on as a late substitute for Stiven Mendoza in a 3–0 home win against Salgueiro, for the year's Copa do Nordeste.

João Victor made his Série A debut on 30 May 2021, replacing Cléber in a 3–2 home success over Grêmio.

On 18 February 2023, João Victor abroad to Japan and announcement officially transfer to J3 newly promoted club, FC Osaka for ahead of 2023 season on loan.

International career
In November 2020, João Victor was called up to the Brazil under-17 team, but had to withdraw due to an injury.

Career statistics

Club
.

References

External links

2004 births
Living people
People from São Luís, Maranhão
Brazilian footballers
Association football forwards
Campeonato Brasileiro Série A players
J3 League players
Ceará Sporting Club players
FC Osaka players
Sportspeople from Maranhão
Brazilian expatriate sportspeople in Japan
Expatriate footballers in Japan